Veela Teja (ਵੀਲ੍ਹਾ ਤੇਜਾ)is a village in Batala in Gurdaspur district of Punjab State, India. The village is administrated by Sarpanch, an elected representative of the village.

Demography 
, the village has a total number of 840 houses and the population of 4435 of which 2329 are males while 2106 are females. According to the report published by Census India in 2011, out of the total population of the village 1028 people are from Schedule Caste and the village does not have any Schedule Tribe population so far.

See also
List of villages in India

References

External links 
 Tourism of Punjab
 Census of Punjab

Villages in Gurdaspur district